The Autonomines is a 1984 Spanish comedy film directed by Rafael Gil and starring Alfredo Landa, and Manolo Codeso. The film parodies the Autonomous communities of Spain which had been created by the 1978 Constitution.

Partial cast

References

External links

1984 comedy films
Spanish comedy films
Films directed by Rafael Gil
1980s Spanish-language films
1980s Spanish films